Namibia competed at the 2019 World Athletics Championships in Doha, Qatar, from 27 September to 6 October 2019. The country's participation there marked its fifteenth appearance in the World Championships since its debut at the 1991 World Championships in Athletics. Namibia sent two athletes to the Championships, both of whom competed in the marathon events. Helalia Johannes became Namibia's first female medallist, and their first medallist in 26 years, when she won a bronze medal in the women's marathon. Tomas Hilifa Rainhold finished in 17th in the men's marathon.

Background
Namibia first competed in the World Athletics Championships (then known as the World Championships in Athletics) in 1991, and have taken part in every Championships since. During that period two athletes won five medals for the country. Their most recent medal had come during the 1997 Championships. To qualify for the World Championships, athletes had to meet the standards set by the IAAF (now known as World Athletics). In most disciplines, these criteria were more difficult to achieve than they had been for the 2017 Championships. Two athletes represented Namibia at the 2019 Championships: Tomas Hilifa Rainhold in the men's marathon and Helalia Johannes in the women's marathon. Rainhold qualified for the Championships courtesy of completing the Hamburg Marathon in 2:14:14, 1 minute and 46 seconds within the required standard of 2:16:00. Johannes, who was the reigning Commonwealth champion after winning the 2018 marathon had set a new Namibia national record in March 2019, running 2:22:25 to win the Nagoya Women's Marathon, well within the required 2:37:00. The two athletes were accompanied by their coach Robert Kaxuxuena.

Medallists

Results

Johannes, taking part in her fourth World Championships, raced in the women's marathon on the opening night of the Championships. Due to the hot conditions expected in Doha, the race started just before midnight. Johannes held onto third place, and finished in 2:34:15, around 30 seconds behind Chelimo and over a minute ahead of Edna Kiplagat in fourth. She became the first female medallist for Namibia at the World Championships.

Rainhold was making his debut at the World Championships. Competing in the men's marathon, which was also held just before midnight, Rainhold ran what the Namibian Sun described as "a good race". He completed the race in 2:14:38, and finished in 17th place. Namibia's solitary bronze medal saw them finish joint 31st on the Championships medal table.

Men

Women

References

Nations at the 2019 World Athletics Championships
World Championships in Athletics
Namibia at the World Championships in Athletics